Alexander Zoran Cvetković (born 29 November 1996) is an English professional footballer who plays as a defensive midfielder for Eintracht Trier. Besides England, he has played in the Netherlands and Luxembourg, and Croatia.

Club career
After a spell in Croatia, on 1 February 2023, Cvetković joined Regionalliga Südwest side Eintracht Trier on a contract until the end of the season.

Career statistics

Club

Notes

References

1996 births
Living people
Footballers from Greater London
English footballers
Association football midfielders
Luxembourg National Division players
Croatian Football League players
Quick Boys players
West Ham United F.C. players
Tottenham Hotspur F.C. players
Manchester United F.C. players
Wigan Athletic F.C. players
CS Fola Esch players
HNK Šibenik players
English expatriate footballers
English expatriate sportspeople in the Netherlands
Expatriate footballers in the Netherlands
English expatriate sportspeople in Luxembourg
Expatriate footballers in Luxembourg
Expatriate footballers in Croatia
English people of Croatian descent
English expatriate sportspeople in Croatia
Expatriate footballers in Germany
English expatriate sportspeople in Germany
SV Eintracht Trier 05 players